Norbert Erdős (born 25 October 1972) is a Hungarian politician and Member of the European Parliament (MEP) from Hungary. He is a member of Fidesz, part of the European People's Party. He was a Member of the National Assembly of Hungary from 2002 to 2014.

He was a member of the Committee on Youth, Social, Family, and Housing Affairs from 8 June 2010 to 14 February 2011. He joined Fidesz in 1993. Erdős was elected one of the recorders of the National Assembly of Hungary on 14 May 2010. He was appointed director of the Government Office of Békés County on 1 January 2011. He became Member of the European Parliament (MEP) during the 2014 European Parliament election. He was appointed Secretary of State for Food Chain Supervision within the Ministry of Agriculture on 1 November 2020.

Personal life
He is married to Orsolya Erdősné Majoros.

References

1972 births
Living people
Fidesz politicians
Members of the National Assembly of Hungary (2002–2006)
Members of the National Assembly of Hungary (2006–2010)
Members of the National Assembly of Hungary (2010–2014)
Members of the National Assembly of Hungary (2022–2026)
People from Orosháza
MEPs for Hungary 2014–2019
Fidesz MEPs